Square rig is a generic type of sail and rigging arrangement in which the primary driving sails are carried on horizontal spars which are perpendicular, or square, to the keel of the vessel and to the masts. These spars are called yards and their tips, outside the lifts, are called the yardarms. A ship mainly rigged so is called a square-rigger.

History 

The oldest archaeological evidence of use of a square-rig on a vessel is an image on a clay disk from Mesopotamia from 5000 BC. Single sail square rigs were used by the ancient Egyptians, the Phoenicians, the Greeks, the Romans, and the Celts. Later the Scandinavians, the Germanic peoples, and the Slavs adopted the single square-rigged sail, with it becoming one of the defining characteristics of the classic “Viking” ships.

See also
 Glossary of nautical terms (A-L)
 Glossary of nautical terms (M-Z)

References

External links
Video: How the Square Rig Works

Sailing rigs and rigging